"Man! I Feel Like a Woman!" is a song by Canadian singer-songwriter Shania Twain from her third studio album, Come On Over (1997). Written by Twain and her longtime collaborator and then-husband Robert John "Mutt" Lange, who also produced the track, the song was released first to North American country radio stations in March 1999 as the eighth single from the album, and it was released worldwide later the same year. "Man! I Feel Like a Woman!" is a country pop song with lyrics about female empowerment.

The song received generally favorable reviews from music critics, who praised the song's attitude and hook as well as Twain's vocals. Commercially, the song was also successful, reaching the top-ten in six countries, while reaching the top-twenty in Canada and number 23 on the US Billboard Hot 100 chart. It was even more successful on the Hot Country Songs chart, reaching the top-five and was certified Platinum  by the Recording Industry Association of America (RIAA) for 1,000,000 digital downloads. The song also won a Grammy for Best Female Country Vocal Performance in 2000.

The accompanying music video for "Man! I Feel Like a Woman!" was released on March 3, 1999, and it pays homage to Robert Palmer's "Addicted to Love" music video, featuring Twain dancing with buffed and blank-eyed male models. It was the opener on both the Come On Over and Up! tours, as well as Twain's headline on the Super Bowl XXXVII Halftime show, and as the closer on the rest of her tours. It was also used to comic effect in a 2004 Chevrolet Colorado TV commercial, as well as being on the soundtrack of Brazilian telenovela Laços de Família. The song was also performed by American Idol winner Carrie Underwood during the fourth season, and by Britney Spears in her first movie Crossroads (2002).

Background and release

The title and thus the lyrics of the song were based on Shania Twain's experience while working at Deerhurst Resort in Huntsville, Ontario to provide for her brothers and sisters after their parents died in a car crash. Twain recalls seeing some drag performers working at the resort and credits them as the source of her inspiration. Later in 1993, after being signed to Mercury Nashville and releasing her first album Shania Twain, Twain met Robert John "Mutt" Lange, whom she would collaborate extensively with and marry at the end of the year. In 1994, while composing songs for what would become her second studio album The Woman in Me, Lange played to Twain a riff he had been working on and Twain sang lyrics for what would become "Man! I Feel Like a Woman!". Speaking of the writing of the song, she stated "There was no time to waste on ideas that wouldn't make the album, but something like [the song] was just there. I was inspired right off the bat with that one, for example, by a riff Mutt had going, and the lyrics and phrasing just came out of the blue."

After reaching domestic success in the United States, and selling over fifteen million copies with The Woman in Me, Twain was determined to become an international star and decided to do whatever was necessary to achieve her goal. In order to achieve a worldwide success, Twain recorded her third studio album, Come On Over, with the intention of being "international". After completing the album and delivering it to Mercury Records, Lange spent four months remixing 70 percent of the album for its international edition, diluting and removing the twang elements. While writing for the album, Twain and Lange revisited "Man! I Feel Like a Woman!" and insisted on having the track on the album. The track was then the final song recorded for Come On Over. The song is the opening track of the U.S. edition of Come On Over, however, the international edition starts with "You're Still the One", since the song has country elements. Initially, "Man! I Feel Like a Woman!" was only released to country radio as the album's seventh single in the United States in March 1999. After the song's success there, it was eventually released to mainstream radio in the U.S. In the United Kingdom, the song was issued as a CD single and cassette single on September 20, 1999.

Composition and lyrics
"Man! I Feel Like a Woman!" was written by Shania Twain and Robert John "Mutt" Lange, who also produced the track. According to the sheet music published at Musicnotes.com by Universal Music Publishing Group, the song starts in the key of B major and modulates to F major in the chorus, with a moderate tempo of 126 beats per minute. Twain's vocals span from the low-note of F3 to the high-note of D5. "Man! I Feel Like a Woman!" is a country pop song, with a guitar riff that conjures Norman Greenbaum's "Spirit in the Sky", as noted by both Chuck Taylor of Billboard and J.D. Considine of Entertainment Weekly. It begins with Twain exclaiming, "Let's go girls". Lyrically, the song is a female empowerment track, with Twain insisting that "the best thing about being a woman is the prerogative to have a little fun" as well as promising to wear a "men's shirt" with a "short skirt." In an interview for Billboard, Twain further explained the song's lyrical meaning, elaborating:

That song started with the title, then it kind of wrote itself. The whole expression is a celebration of being a woman these days, I think we're kind of spoiled in a lot of ways, with the advantages we have. Feminists may not feel that way, but I do. It's pretty darn fun to be a woman.

In an interview with American LGBT-interest magazine The Advocate, Twain also discussed the song:

A lot of the stuff I do has such a feminine, female perspective, but a powerful one. It's not only girl power, it's gay power. I think that song really stands for both.

Critical reception
The song received generally favorable reviews from music critics. Writing for Billboard, Chuck Taylor commented that "there's no reason that 'Man!', with its coquettish turn of phrase, shouldn't have the same kind of appeal as her earlier 'That Don't Impress Me Much'," also noting that the song has "plenty of tasty ingredients that radio traditionally searches out – great tempo, attitude, a hook that sells like ice cream in summer, and the instantly recognizable vocals of a woman who is a found acquaintance of so many millions out there now." Taylor ultimately called it "country crossover at its best." Daily Record stated that Twain "enjoys a change of direction with this brassy line-dancing hit." Chuck Eddy of Rolling Stone noted that "Man! I Feel Like a Woman!" and other high-gloss songs "open with a bubblegum-glam cheerleader shout, then blasts into radio-ready rapture with offhand vocal interjections – doot-doot-doot scatting, do-si-do rapping, sexy squeaks, sarcastic Alanis Morissette asides."

The staff from the Sputnikmusic website praised the track, calling it "a high point of the album with it being a classic example of upbeat feel-good power-pop, which is notable both for the production, something that is notably strong throughout the album, but also for the instrumental quality present. It's possible almost to feel the enjoyment that was present in making this song when listening to it, and there's even a guitar solo, which again pulls the listener in." While reviewing both Twain's "Come on Over" and "Greatest Hits" albums, Stephen Thomas Erlewine of Allmusic picked the song as one of the compilation's highlights, while Nick Reynolds of BBC Music named it "the sound of a thousand Saturday nights in clubs all over the Western World." Brian James wrote for PopMatters that the song "has a title-word-to-exclamation-point ratio that would make the headline writer at 'The National Enquirer' blush."

Accolades
"Man! I Feel Like a Woman!" earned Shania Twain her second Grammy Award for Best Female Country Vocal Performance in its 42nd edition, which also saw her winning another award for Best Country Song for the song "Come On Over". The song also won both BMI Songwriter Awards and SOCAN'S for "One of the Most Performed Songs of the Year". Kay Savage of CMT picked the track as one of her "10 Prime Hits", asking: "Is there any better song to start a Friday night than 'Man! I Feel Like a Woman!'?." Savage also wrote that the "Grammy-winning song brings out [her] best Southern qualities for a really-go-wild, doing-it-in-style, country good time. Shania even took the pain out of girls' usual conferences of 'what should I wear tonight' by providing a simple answer: men's shirts and short skirts. Genius." Laura McClellan of Taste of Country picked the song as her "All-Time Best Song", writing that "the track's iconic intro lick and catchy singalong vibe won this song a Grammy and a No. 4 slot on the country charts. The most staunch pop purists can still sing along to this one years later, even if they mumble the chorus a bit in the middle."

While listing the "Top 10 Girl Power Songs", The Boot website placed it at number ten, praising Shania for "embrac[ing] her inner feminist in this Grammy-winning single," calling it "music to any man's ears." In the same vein, Fatima Bhojani of Mother Jones magazine picked the line, "We don't need romance, we only wanna dance/We're gonna let our hair hang down," as the best lyric of the song. Writing for NPR Music, Ann Powers commented that the song "connects crossover country to the rock world in no uncertain terms, expanding the genre's heritage in ways that directly reflect the eclectic tastes of its younger audience." The A.V. Club editors, while analysing the "17 well-intended yet misguided feminist anthems", concluded that:

Chart performance

North America
"Man! I Feel Like a Woman!" debuted on the US Billboard Hot Country Singles & Tracks chart on March 6, 1999, at number 53, becoming the highest debut of the week. The single spent 20 weeks on the chart and climbed to a peak position of number four on June 12, 1999, where it remained for two weeks. The single became Twain's 11th (and seventh consecutive) Top 10 on the country charts. On the US Billboard Hot 100, it debuted at number 93 on the week of April 17, 1999. It spent 28 weeks on the chart and peaked at number 23 for one week on November 13, 1999. In the same week, the song peaked at number 18 on the Hot 100 Airplay chart. Come on Over's fifth US adult contemporary release, "Man! I Feel Like a Woman!" debuted at number 29 the week of October 2, 1999, the highest debut of the week. The single spent 26 weeks on the chart and climbed to a peak position of number 16 on December 18, 1999, where it remained for one week. While on the Adult Top 40, it debuted at number 30 and peaked at number 12. On the Top 40 Tracks, the song debuted at number 32 and peaked at number 20. The song has sold 853,000 digital copies in the US as of September 2015.

Australia and Europe
"Man! I Feel Like a Woman!" became Twain's second consecutive number-one in New Zealand, after "That Don't Impress Me Much". And like her previous number one this also debuted at the top spot, and was certified platinum, making it her biggest single in that country. In Australia, the song debuted at number 5 and peaked at number 4 a week later, becoming her fifth consecutive top-five single. In France, the song became her first and only top-ten single, spending 31 weeks on the charts, while spending 13 weeks inside the top-ten and three weeks at its peak position at number 3. In the UK, "Man! I Feel Like a Woman!" became Twain's second highest selling single, being certified Platinum. The song debuted at its peak position at number three, on October 2, 1999, where it remained for two weeks. It remained in the top ten for another two weeks. It remained on the entire chart for 18 weeks. "Man! I Feel Like a Woman!" became Twain's fourth top-ten (and third consecutive) in the UK.

Music video

The music video for "Man! I Feel Like a Woman!" was shot in New York City and directed by Paul Boyd. It debuted on March 3, 1999, on CMT. The video is a role-reversed version of Robert Palmer's "Addicted to Love" and "Simply Irresistible" music videos. In the music video, Twain stands in front of a group of men, all dressed alike, one playing electric guitar, one playing bass, one playing drums, one playing the two neck guitar, and one playing keyboard, complete with buffed and blank-eye, meant to imitate the women from Palmer's videos. Twain starts the video dressed in a long coat and a veiled top hat, white dress shirt, black tie, but throughout the video she strips off items of clothing until she is left wearing a black corset, mini skirt, thigh-high boots, a black choker, and black gloves. Twain even has black eyeshadow on.

The video won the MuchMoreMusic Video of the Year award at the MuchMusic Video Awards in 2000. The video uses the 'Alternate Mix', which tones down the guitar and synth parts and blends them into the background. The 'Alternate Mix' of the video is available on Twain's compilations Come On Over: Video Collection (1999) and The Platinum Collection (2001), though an alternate version of the video using the 'International Version' was used as a backdrop for Twain's performance of the song on her Top of the Pops special in 1999. On YouTube, "Man! I Feel Like a Woman!" is Twain's most-viewed video with 322 million views as of November 2022. On November 1, 2022 a remastered HD version of the music video, using the 'Original Album Version', was released to commemorate the 25th anniversary of the parent album Come On Over.

Live performances
Shania Twain performed the song on her "Come On Over Tour" (1998), "Up! Tour" (2003), "Shania: Still the One" residency show (2012-2014), "Rock This Country Tour" (2015) and the "Shania Now Tour" (2018) . On the first two tours the song was the opening song, while during the residency show and on the last two tours it was featured in the encore. It was also the opening song of her "Shania Twain Live", "Winter Break" and "Up! Live in Chicago" live video albums, as well as on her headline on the Super Bowl XXXVII halftime show. The song was also performed by American Idol winner Carrie Underwood during the fourth season.
During Harry Styles' Coachella performance on April 15, He sang the song along with Twain.

Track listings

 Australian CD single
 "Man! I Feel Like a Woman!" (international album version) – 3:57
 "I'm Holdin' On to Love (To Save My Life)" (pop mix) – 3:48
 "Love Gets Me Every Time" (Mach 3 Remix) – 3:42
 "Man! I Feel Like a Woman!" (alternate mix) – 3:59
 "Man! I Feel Like a Woman!" (video)

 European CD single
 "Man! I Feel Like a Woman!" – 3:54
 "Don't Be Stupid (You Know I Love You)" (extended dance mix) – 4:44

 European maxi-CD single
 "Man! I Feel Like a Woman!" – 3:54
 "Black Eyes, Blue Tears" (Live/Direct TV mix) – 4:22
 "That Don't Impress Me Much" (India mix) – 4:42
 "Man! I Feel Like a Woman!" (alternate version) – 3:53

 UK CD1
 "Man! I Feel Like a Woman!" (country LP version) – 3:53
 "Love Gets Me Every Time" (Live/Direct TV mix) – 3:51
 "Any Man of Mine" – 4:07
 "Man! I Feel Like a Woman!" (video)

 UK CD2
 "Man! I Feel Like a Woman!" (country LP version) – 3:53
 "Don't Be Stupid (You Know I Love You)" (extended dance mix) – 4:44
 "Any Man of Mine" – 4:07
 "Man! I Feel Like a Woman!" (video) – 3:53

 UK cassette single
 "Man! I Feel Like a Woman!" (country LP version) – 3:53
 "Don't Be Stupid (You Know I Love You)" (extended dance mix) – 4:44

Credits and personnel
Credits are taken from the Come On Over album booklet.

Studio
 Recorded and mastered at Masterfonics (Nashville, Tennessee)

Personnel

 Shania Twain – writing, vocals, background vocals
 Robert John "Mutt" Lange – writing, background vocals, production
 Biff Watson – guitars
 Dann Huff – guitars, guitar solo, guitar textures, six-string bass, talk box
 Brent Mason – electric guitar
 Larry Byrom – slide guitar
 Paul Franklin – pedal steel guitar
 Joe Chemay – electric and fretless bass
 Stuart Duncan – fiddle
 Bow Bros – gang fiddles
 John Hobbs – Wurlitzer
 Paul Leim – drums
 Mike Shipley – mixing
 Olle Romo – programming, Pro Tools, sequencing, editing
 Glenn Meadows – mastering

Charts

Weekly charts

Year-end charts

Certifications

Usage in pop culture
The song was featured in a 2005 episode of America's Funniest Home Videos in a montage showing clips of women. The song was part of the soundtrack of Brazilian successful telenovela Laços de Família. American recording artist Britney Spears and actresses Zoe Saldana and Taryn Manning sang along to the track during Spears' first movie Crossroads (2002). In that same year, it was performed by Molly Shannon in the form of a Christmas spoof in The Santa Clause 2. It was used to comic effect in a 2004 Chevrolet Colorado TV commercial, in which a group of men are traveling in one of the vehicles, and one of them begins singing along very enthusiastically with Twain's recording (from the female narrative), much to the discomfort of his friends. It also appeared to comedic effect in an episode of Limmy's Show, in which Limmy aka Brian Limond plays a woman dressed in leopard print halter top and leather skirt, attempting to corral the viewer into declaring "Let's Go Girls!" following the song's opening riff. On the third attempt, the camera appears to accelerate towards this character, striking her and propelling her across the Glasgow skyline. The woman finally falls to the ground after colliding with a tall building, revealing in the process that she is wearing a "strap on" dildo beneath her skirt. The scene ends with the woman lying in great pain and embarrassment.

Japanese-British singer Rina Sawayama also references "Man! I Feel Like a Woman!" in her 2022 song "This Hell", which begins with the line "Let's go, girls".

References

1997 songs
1999 singles
LGBT-related songs
Feminism in Canada
Music videos directed by Paul Boyd
Mercury Records singles
Mercury Nashville singles
Number-one singles in New Zealand
Shania Twain songs
Song recordings produced by Robert John "Mutt" Lange
Songs with feminist themes
Songs written by Robert John "Mutt" Lange
Songs written by Shania Twain